The West Indies cricket team toured Bangladesh from 29 November 2002 to 20 December 2002. The tour included two Tests and three One Day Internationals (ODIs) between West Indies and Bangladesh.

ODI Series

1st ODI

2nd ODI

3rd ODI

Test series

1st Test

2nd Test

References

2002-03
2002 in Bangladeshi cricket
International cricket competitions in 2002–03
2002 in West Indian cricket
Bangladeshi cricket seasons from 2000–01